Alucita major is a moth of the family Alucitidae. It is found in Italy, Croatia, Romania, Bulgaria, the Republic of Macedonia, Greece and on Sardinia, Sicily and Crete. It has also been recorded from Turkey.

References

Moths described in 1906
Alucitidae
Moths of Europe
Moths of Asia
Taxa named by Hans Rebel